Robert Jellett (born c. 1960) is a former Ottawa City Councillor. He represented the large Cumberland Ward, located at the eastern edge of the city from 2003 to 2010.  Jellett worked as a reporter, news anchor and Assistant News Director with local radio stations CFMO and CFRA for eighteen years.  He then became the assistant to Cumberland councillor Phil McNeely in 2000.  When McNeely was elected to the provincial legislature Jellet ran to replace him in the 2003 Ottawa election. Running against Garry Lowe the main issue was the construction of an industrial hog farm in the village of Sarsfield.  Jellett was strongly opposed while Lowe supported the idea.  Jellett ended up winning by a substantial margin, however a court later ruled the city could not stop the project.  Jellett, who describes himself as a Red Tory, was also forced to abandon his pledge to not raise taxes due to the difficulties surrounding the 2004 budget. Jellett served as the Chair of the city's Agriculture and Rural Affairs Committee and sat on eight other city committee's and advisory boards.

Election results

Ottawa municipal election, 2003

Ottawa municipal election, 2006

References

External links
Rob Jelett website (under construction)
City biography

Ottawa city councillors
Living people
1960s births